Walsh Jesuit High School is a private, Catholic, co-educational college preparatory high school located in Cuyahoga Falls, Ohio, approximately 30 miles south of Cleveland.

Walsh Jesuit is reputed to be one of Ohio's leading college preparatory schools and is consistently ranked among the top high schools in Northeast Ohio for college scholarships in Crain’s Cleveland Business.  It is a member of the Jesuit Schools Network with a motto of “Men and Women for and with Others,” with a stated mission of instilling in its students the spirit of St. Ignatius Loyola, the founder of the Jesuits. 

Walsh's campus covers 110 acres and is situated just minutes from the Cuyahoga Valley National Park, featuring five outdoor athletic fields, a 5,000 meter cross country track, a 1,600 seat gymnasium, a field house, wrestling room, and an All Sports Complex (formerly known as Conway Memorial Stadium).
The school's chapel, named in honor of its patron saints the North American Jesuit Martyrs, is topped with the distinctive metallic cross which has become the school's most prominent symbol and landmark.

History

Walsh Jesuit High School was funded by a generous gift from Cornelius Walsh (b. 1864), a prominent industrialist and Catholic layman who had lived his entire life in Cuyahoga Falls. Upon his death in 1932, Cornelius bequeathed his entire fortune to his wife, Jane, who continued to donate generously to Catholic institutions and, with the assistance of her nephew, William A. Walsh, designed her will to include a large gift for the foundation of a Catholic high school. William, partial to the Jesuits, convinced his aunt to bequeath to the Society of Jesus her property and $100,000 for the building of an all-boys school that would be a memorial to her husband.  William approached the Chicago Province of the Jesuits with the proposal, but the gift lay dormant for years until found during a transfer of files from the Chicago Province to the Detroit Province in 1959. William urged Fr. John McGrail, S.J., the head of the Jesuits' Detroit Province, to reconsider the proposal made in Jane's will.  The school's campus was originally planned to be built in downtown Cuyahoga Falls near St. Joseph Parish School, but using the gift from Jane (which had grown to $2 million under William's stewardship, and to which the Cleveland Catholic Diocese added $1 million), 50 acres were purchased from the Conway family farm north of downtown, with an additional 50 acres purchased later.

Groundbreaking ceremonies for Walsh Jesuit took place in 1964, and the school opened its doors to 153 freshmen on September 7, 1965. The school was dedicated in May 1966, and the first class graduated in 1969. All Students were required to wear neckties, a shirt with a collar, and hair not falling over the ears. A "tie strike" was organized in 1969, which was easily quashed.

Initially founded as an all-boys institution similar to other prominent Northeast Ohio Catholic high schools, Walsh Jesuit's leadership decided to go co-ed in 1991 amid excess capacity and financial challenges to the school's continued existence. The decision was initially met with resistance by many Walsh Jesuit alumni and students, culminating in a student walkout, which received extensive local media coverage, when the news of the decision was made public. Despite the protests, the first girls entered the school at the beginning of the 1993-1994 academic year, and currently constitute approximately half of the overall student population.

The school's sports nickname is the "Warriors," originally conceived as a means of celebrating the heritage of the Seneca Indians that had previously inhabited the area. However, in 2021, as a response to the Native American mascot controversy, the school formally disassociated the name "Warriors" from any reference to Native American culture, removed Native American iconography from its sports uniforms and facilities, and changed the name of its annual fundraising gala.

Athletics
Walsh Jesuit has won seven team national championships and a total of 39 Ohio High School Athletic Association team state championships. The school is also home to 113 individual state championships in various sports. Walsh Jesuit currently competes in the Crown Conference, since the beginning of the 2021–22 school year.  Walsh Jesuit was previously a member of the North Coast League from 2011 to 2020.

National championships
 Boys' Wrestling - 1993, 1994, 1995, 1996
 Girls' Soccer - 2000, 2006, 2010

State championships

 Boys' Cross Country – 1984, 2002
 Boys' Baseball – 1999, 2004, 2006, 2008
 Football – 1999
 Boys' Wrestling – 1991, 1993, 1994, 1995, 1996, 1997, 1999, 2000
 Boys' Golf – 1990, 1991, 1996, 1997
 Boys' Soccer – 1982, 1990, 2006
 Girls' Golf – 2001, 2004, 2007
 Girls' Soccer – 2000, 2001, 2004, 2006, 2010, 2012, 2013, 2014, 2015, 2016
 Softball – 2002, 2004, 2016
 Girls' Basketball – 2005

Notable alumni
Ryan Armour (1994), professional golfer on the PGA Tour
Christopher Connor (1974), CEO of Sherwin-Williams Co.
Connor Cook (2011), quarterback for the Michigan State Spartans and Oakland Raiders
Ryan Feltner (2015), MLB pitcher for the Colorado Rockies
Steve Fitzhugh (1982), former NFL safety with the Denver Broncos
Drew Kaser (2011), former NFL punter
Brock Kreitzburg (1994), member of the USA-1 four man bobsled team that placed seventh in the 2006 Winter Olympics
Tom Lopienski (1998), former Notre Dame and NFL fullback
Kenneth Merten (1979), United States Ambassador to Croatia
Tim Murphy (1970), member of the United States House of Representatives
Michael Nanchoff (2007), 8th overall pick of the Vancouver Whitecaps
Kevin O'Neill (1993), former NFL linebacker
Adam Redmond (2011), NFL offensive guard
Jason Rohrer (1996), game designer
Mike Vrabel (1993), former NFL linebacker and current head coach for the Tennessee Titans

See also
 List of Jesuit sites

References

External links
Walsh Jesuit High School official website
Jesuit Secondary Education Association official website

Jesuit high schools in the United States
High schools in Summit County, Ohio
Catholic secondary schools in Ohio
Educational institutions established in 1965
Cuyahoga Falls, Ohio
Roman Catholic Diocese of Cleveland
1965 establishments in Ohio